Lifebuoy is a brand of soap marketed by Unilever. Lifebuoy was originally, and for much of its history, a carbolic soap containing phenol (carbolic acid, a compound extracted from coal tar). The soaps manufactured today under the Lifebuoy brand do not contain phenol. Currently, there are many varieties of Lifebuoy.

History

Lifebuoy was introduced by Lever Brothers in 1895 in the United Kingdom. Originally a carbolic soap containing phenol, different varieties were later introduced without the medicinal carbolic smell, such as the coral-coloured Lifebuoy during the late 1950s and Lifebuoy Minty Refresher in 1966. Lifebuoy was one of the most popular soaps in the United States from approximately 1923 to the mid-‘50s, 

Although Lifebuoy is no longer produced in the US and UK, it is still being mass-produced by Unilever in Cyprus for the UK, EU (on hold and under investigation) and Brazilian markets, in Trinidad and Tobago for the Caribbean market, and in India for the Asian market. Unilever in Cyprus and Trinidad and Tobago is manufacturing the Red Lifebuoy Soap with a carbolic fragrance, but as of 1976 it no longer contains phenol. The Lifebuoy soap manufactured in India and Indonesia for other markets including South and South East Asia has been updated to use red and other colours with ‘modern’ aromas.

References in popular culture

When the Philadelphia Phillies played at the Baker Bowl during the 1930s, an outfield wall advertisement for Lifebuoy stated, "The Phillies use Lifebuoy". One night in 1935, a vandal added, "And they still stink". Variations of the joke were also employed by detractors of other losing teams.

The term "B.O.", short for "body odor", is often thought to have been invented by Lifebuoy for an advertising campaign.  It was actually coined by a company that made deodorant for women called Odo-Ro-No in 1919, but Lifebuoy popularized the term. The Lifebuoy radio ad, parodied by several Warner Brothers' Looney Tunes cartoons and MGM Cartoons, used a foghorn followed by a "B.O." sound created using a Sonovox.

During a 1969 Episode of The Tonight Show, while being bathed by two Japanese women, Johnny Carson joked, "This beats Lifebuoy and a rubber duck, doesn't it?"

In the 2016 novel Moonglow by Michael Chabon, Lifebuoy is used to signify wholesomeness and youth: "He had deposited with his brother for safekeeping a girl who smelled of Lifebuoy and library paste and retrieved a young woman who smelled of cigarettes and Ban.”

It is the bar-soap used in the 1983 movie A Christmas Story by the main character Ralphie and his family. After his mother uses it to wash his mouth out for swearing, Ralphie wishfully imagines a future in which he has been blinded by "soap poisoning" and reduced to begging on the street; when his family sees him, they collapse into melodramatic soap opera-like tears and his father cries out, "I told you not to use Lifebuoy!" In the film, narrator Jean Shepherd noted his disgust toward its taste, comparing it to other brands that his mother had used for similar punishments in the past.

Sponsorships
Lifebuoy has been the shirt sponsor of the Bangladesh National Cricket Team since 2018. Lifebuoy sponsored McLaren from 2020 onwards. Lifebuoy is the main hygiene supplier for McLaren Racing.

References

External links
 

Soap brands
Unilever brands
Products introduced in 1895
English brands